The 148th New York State Legislature, consisting of the New York State Senate and the New York State Assembly, met from January 7 to June 26, 1925, during the third year of Al Smith's second tenure as Governor of New York, in Albany.

Background
Under the provisions of the New York Constitution of 1894, re-apportioned in 1917, 51 Senators and 150 assemblymen were elected in single-seat districts; senators for a two-year term, assemblymen for a one-year term. The senatorial districts consisted either of one or more entire counties; or a contiguous area within a single county. The counties which were divided into more than one senatorial district were New York (nine districts), Kings (eight), Bronx (three), Erie (three), Monroe (two), Queens (two) and Westchester (two). The Assembly districts were made up of contiguous area, all within the same county.

At this time there were two major political parties: the Republican Party and the Democratic Party. The Socialist Party, the Workers Party and the Socialist Labor Party also nominated tickets.

Elections
The New York state election, 1924, was held on November 4. Governor Al Smith (Dem.) was re-elected, but the other six incumbent Democratic state officers were defeated by their Republican challengers. State Senator Seymour Lowman (Rep.) was elected Lieutenant Governor, the last time in New York history that the governor and the lieutenant governor were elected from opposing tickets. The approximate party strength at this election, as expressed by the vote for Governor, was: Democrats 1,627,000; Republicans 1,519,000; Socialists 100,000; Workers 6,000; and Socialist Labor 5,000.

For the first time, a woman was elected to a statewide elective office: Florence E. S. Knapp was elected Secretary of State of New York. At the end of her term she was accused of maladministration, and was convicted of grand larceny in office in 1928. After the re-organisation of the state administration in 1926, the office became appointive, and has remained so ever since. Knapp remained the only woman elected to a statewide elective office in New York for fifty years, until the election of Mary Anne Krupsak as Lieutenant Governor of New York in 1974.

Only one woman was elected to the State Assembly: Rhoda Fox Graves (Rep.), of Gouverneur, a former school teacher who after her marriage became active in women's organisations and politics.

Sessions
The Legislature met for the regular session at the State Capitol in Albany on January 7, 1925; and adjourned on March 27.

Joseph A. McGinnies (Rep.) was elected Speaker.

John Knight (Rep.) was elected Temporary President of the State Senate.

In his annual message, Gov. Al Smith proposed a thorough reconstruction of the state administration. During the next two years, many state departments were abolished, merged or created. Most notably, of three offices which had been statewide elective since 1847, one (the Secretary of State) was made appointive, and two (the State Engineer and the State Treasurer) were abolished, the duties being taken over by other departments.

The Legislature met for a special session at the State Capitol in Albany on June 22, 1925; and adjourned on June 26. This session was called by Gov. Al Smith to reconsider the state park legislation passed during the regular session.

State Senate

Districts

Members

The asterisk (*) denotes members of the previous Legislature who continued in office as members of this Legislature. Thomas F. Burchill, William J. Hickey and Leigh G. Kirkland changed from the Assembly to the Senate.

Note: For brevity, the chairmanships omit the words "...the Committee on (the)..."

Employees
 Clerk: Ernest A. Fay
 Sergeant-at-Arms: Charles R. Hotaling
 Assistant Sergeant-at-Arms: 
 Principal Doorkeeper: 
 First Assistant Doorkeeper: 
 Stenographer:

State Assembly

Assemblymen

Note: For brevity, the chairmanships omit the words "...the Committee on (the)..."

Employees
 Clerk: Fred W. Hammond

Notes

Sources
 Members of the New York Senate (1920s) at Political Graveyard
 Members of the New York Assembly (1920s) at Political Graveyard

148
1925 in New York (state)
1925 U.S. legislative sessions